Quezon City's 3rd congressional district is one of the six congressional districts of the Philippines in Quezon City. It has been represented in the House of Representatives of the Philippines since 1987. The district consists of the southeastern barangays bordering Marikina and Pasig to the southeast, Kamias Road and the second district to the north, the fourth district to the west and San Juan to the southwest via EDSA. It contains the commercial areas of Cubao, Libis, Bagumbayan, Ugong Norte and the residential areas of Loyola Heights, Quirino, Old Balara and Blue Ridge. It is currently represented in the 19th Congress by Franz Pumaren of the National Unity Party (NUP).

Representation history

Election results

2010

2013

2016

2019

2022

See also
Legislative districts of Quezon City

References

Congressional districts of the Philippines
Politics of Quezon City
1987 establishments in the Philippines
Congressional districts of Metro Manila
Constituencies established in 1987